Turbonilla alvheimi is a species of sea snail, a marine gastropod mollusk in the family Pyramidellidae, the pyrams and their allies. The species is named after Oddgeir Alvheim, a senior technician at the EAF-Nansen Programme who studied marine fauna off the coast of Africa.

Distribution
This species lives in the Gulf of Guinea, West Africa.

Description
The Turbonilla alvheimi has a tall, hard, milky-white cone-shaped shell, with a pointy top.

References

External links
 To Encyclopedia of Life
 To World Register of Marine Species

alvheimi
Gastropods described in 2010